Bladina is a genus of planthoppers found in North and South America.

Taxonomy
, Bladina contains the following species:
 Bladina anser 
 Bladina bispinata 
 Bladina dlabolai 
 Bladina fowleri 
 Bladina fraterna 
 Bladina fuscovenosa 
 Bladina gatunensis 
 Bladina lacydes 
 Bladina loisae 
 Bladina magnifrons 
 Bladina malaisei 
 Bladina mimica 
 Bladina molorchus 
 Bladina osborni 
 Bladina pallidinervis 
 Bladina rudis 
 Bladina subovata 
 Bladina synavei 
 Bladina vexans

References

Nogodinidae
Auchenorrhyncha genera